The 1912 Nebraska Cornhuskers football team represented the University of Nebraska as a member of the Missouri Valley Conference (MVC) during the 1912 college football season. The team was coached by second-year head coach Ewald O. Stiehm and played its home games at Nebraska Field in Lincoln, Nebraska.

On October 26, Nebraska defeated Adrian, beginning a 34-game unbeaten streak that lasted until November 18, 1916.

Schedule

Roster

Starters

Coaching staff

Game summaries

Bellevue

Sources:

This was the final meeting between Bellevue and Nebraska.

Kansas State

Sources:

at Minnesota

Sources:

Nebraska's defense fended off several long Minnesota drives in the first half, which ended scoreless. After a Minnesota touchdown to open the second half, Nebraska used a 72-yard run to get to Minnesota's three-yard line. However, an interception was returned for a second Gophers touchdown and NU was held scoreless for the rest of the game.

Adrian

Sources:

This was the only meeting between Adrian and Nebraska. Both teams played without regular starters due to injury. Three Nebraska starters were out; Harman, Meyer, and Potter. Five Adrian starters did not make the trip from Michigan due to injury leaving a total of 15 players.

Nebraska scored three touchdowns in the first half and sent in many replacements once it was obvious Adrian couldn't keep up. Local news reported that the forward pass was used frequently by both teams. Nebraska completed 4 of 10 attempts for 57 yards while Adrian completed 2 of 5 for 0 yards.

at Missouri

Sources:

Doane

Sources:

The was the final meeting between Doane and Nebraska.

Kansas

Sources:

Oklahoma

Sources:

This was the first meeting in what would become one of college football's most storied rivalries.

References

Nebraska
Nebraska Cornhuskers football seasons
Missouri Valley Conference football champion seasons
Nebraska Cornhuskers football